Oh Jang-Eun (born 24 July 1985) is a football player from South Korea. He was selected to play for Asian Cup 2007, replacing Kim Nam-Il after his injury.

Club career
In 2002, Oh Jang-Eun debuted for Japanese J1 League side FC Tokyo, and set the record for the youngest player to play in the J1 League. Unusually for a Korean, he spent time in the junior ranks of FC Tokyo, rather than having a youth career with a Korean University side. He moved to South Korean K-League side Daegu FC, where he would spend two seasons. He then moved to Ulsan Hyundai Horang-i in 2007, and contributed to the club's win in the 2007 K-League Cup. He made a professional career first hat-trick in an away match against Jeonbuk Hyundai Motors on 23 September 2006.

On 1 February 2011, Oh Jang-Eun signed for Suwon Samsung Bluewings.

International career
Oh has been a member of the national side, both at junior and senior level. He played in the U-20 side in the 2005 FIFA World Youth Championship. A part-timer in the senior side since making his senior debut against Ghana in 2006, the most recent of his 14 caps was against Japan, during the 2010 East Asian Football Championship.

Club statistics

National team statistics

Honours

Club
FC Tokyo
J.League Cup (1): 2004

Ulsan Hyundai Horang-i
K-League Cup (1): 2007

References

External links
 
 
 National Team Player Record 
 
 

1985 births
Living people
Association football midfielders
South Korean footballers
South Korean expatriate footballers
South Korea international footballers
FC Tokyo players
Daegu FC players
Ulsan Hyundai FC players
Suwon Samsung Bluewings players
Seongnam FC players
Daejeon Hana Citizen FC players
J1 League players
K League 1 players
K League 2 players
Expatriate footballers in Japan
2007 AFC Asian Cup players
Footballers at the 2008 Summer Olympics
Olympic footballers of South Korea
South Korean expatriate sportspeople in Japan
Footballers at the 2006 Asian Games
Asian Games competitors for South Korea
Sportspeople from Jeju Province